The Tyrrell 011 was a Formula One car designed by Maurice Philippe for the Tyrrell Racing Organisation.

Overview 
It made its debut in the hands of American Eddie Cheever at the 1981 German Grand Prix where he qualified 18th and finished the race in the points with 5th place. The car was powered by the Cosworth DFV V8 engine and initially ran on Avon tyres though the team later switched to Goodyear rubber.

Drivers for Tyrrell in that time included Cheever, Michele Alboreto, Brian Henton, Slim Borgudd and Danny Sullivan. Tyrrell were able to win 2 races with the 011, both by Alboreto. The first win at the 1982 Caesars Palace Grand Prix was also Alboreto's first and the last 011 victory was the 1983 Detroit Grand Prix.

The 1983 cars were green and black in colour and were sponsored by the Italian fashion brand Benetton.

The 011 was replaced two-thirds of the way through the 1983 season by the Tyrrell 012.

Complete Formula One World Championship results
(key) (results in italics indicate fastest lap)

* 6 points scored in  using the Tyrrell 010* 1 point scored in  using the Tyrrell 012

References

External links

Tyrrell Formula One cars
1981 Formula One season cars
1982 Formula One season cars
1983 Formula One season cars